White Heat is a British television drama series, written by Paula Milne, and first broadcast on BBC Two from 8 March to 12 April 2012. The series follows seven students who first meet in a London, Tufnell Park flatshare in 1965 and consists of six one-hour episodes, set in 1965, 1967, 1973, 1979, 1982 and 1990.

The series was trailed in Radio Times with an article titled Our Friends in the South, an echo of Peter Flannery's 1996 television series Our Friends in the North. Milne herself rejected a direct comparison, however; "Our Friends in the North was absolutely seminal. But it didn't have a lot to do with women, and it didn't have a lot to do with race, and it didn't have a lot to do with sexual politics."  Milne, who had experience of both the Central School of Art and Design and the Royal College of Art in the mid-1960s, said her experience most tallied with that of the character Lilly (MyAnna Buring).

"The mix of the personal and the political is framed by a flash-forward to the present day, in which the house is revisited by the former friends after one of their number dies and makes them the executors of his or her will." The identity of the dead character is withheld until the final episode.

Milne has said she thinks its theme is "the disappointment of the Left. [...] Edward, Jack's father, says to Jack during the 1979 episode (when Margaret Thatcher is elected), that 'this is the end of consensus politics and it's you guys who opened the door and let her in. Just remember that'. Fucking right they did. Excuse my French."

The title of the sixth episode comes from the nickname for the Japanese forest Aokigahara.

Episodes
1: The Past Is a Foreign Country – 8 March 2012
2: Eve of Destruction – 15 March 2012
3: The Dark Side of the Moon – 22 March 2012
4: The Personal Is Political – 29 March 2012
5: The Eye of the Needle – 5 April 2012
6: The Sea of Trees – 12 April 2012

Cast

Supporting cast
 Beth Pew – Tamsin Greig
 Miles – Richard Lintern
 Edward Walsh – Jeremy Northam
 Derek Bowden – Julian Barratt
 Val – Karen Henthorn
 Frank – Geoff Leesley
 Leo - Euan MacNaughton
 Boris - Tim Barlow
 Alec - William Bliss
 Alicia - Rebecca Calder
 Stephen - Brendan Foster
 Saaghoor - Abhin Galeya
 Emma - Abigail Guiver
 TJ - Emma Hartley-Miller
 Granger - Adam Leese
 Gareth - Jonathan Readwin
 Aasif - Akshay Kumar
 Nancy - Sally Mortemore
 Connor - Andrew Simpson
 Ewan - Christian Roe
 Owen - Adam Woodroffe
 Leah - Holly Weston

Music used in the series

Episode 1
 Jimi Hendrix - Purple Haze
 Petula Clark – Downtown
 Dusty Springfield
 The Who – My Generation
 The Yardbirds – For Your Love
 The McCoys – Hang On Sloopy
 The Kinks - You Really Got Me

Episode 2
 The Pretty Things – S.F. Sorrow
 The Spencer Davis Group - Gimme Some Lovin
 Bob Dylan - The Times They Are a-Changin'
 Elton John - Saturday Night's Alright For Fighting

Episode 3
 Pink Floyd – The Dark Side of the Moon
 David Bowie – The Jean Genie

Episode 4
 The Clash – London Calling
 Queen – Don't Stop Me Now

Episode 5
 Culture Club – Do You Really Want to Hurt Me?

Filming locations
Although notionally set in Tufnell Park, exterior shots of the house were filmed in Avenue Park Road, Tulse Hill, on the other side of London. The property has subsequently been refurbished, and as of April 2011 was for sale at £1.6 million.

References

External links
 
 

2010s British drama television series
2012 British television series debuts
2012 British television series endings
BBC television dramas
2010s British television miniseries
English-language television shows
Television series by ITV Studios
Television series set in 1965
Television series set in 1967
Television series set in 1973
Television series set in 1979
Television series set in 1982
Television series set in 1990
Television shows set in London